Monument to the Sun or The Greeting to the Sun is a monument in Zadar, Croatia dedicated to the Sun. It consists of three hundred, multi-layered glass plates placed on the same level as the stone-paved waterfront. It consists of a 22-meter diameter circle, with photovoltaic solar modules underneath. Lighting elements installed in a circle turn on at night, and produce a light show. The monument, designed by Croatian architect Nikola Bašić, symbolizes communication with nature, communicates with light, while the nearby Sea organ communicates with sound.

Location

The monument is located at the entrance to the port of the Croatian town of Zadar on the western point of the Zadar peninsula.

Design

The monument consists of 300 multi-layered glass plates placed on the same level with the stone-paved waterfront in the shape of a 22-meter diameter circle. Beside the main (Sun) installation, looking from the west side are similar smaller installations representing the planets of the Solar System. The size of the Sun and planets are proportional, as well as the distance from the center of each plate, but the size and distance proportions are different because the planets are so far away. Beneath the glass are photovoltaic solar modules with lighting elements which turn on at night, and produce a light show.

On the chrome ring that surrounds the photovoltaics on the Sun are inscribed the names of all of the saints after which churches on the Zadar peninsula have been named. Next to their names and their feast dates are the declination and the altitude of the Sun north or south of the equator (DEC minimum of -23 degrees to a maximum of 23 degrees), the length of the sunlight in the meridian on that day, and in that place on the waterfront, which makes this Monument kind of a calendar. This was prepared in cooperation with marine scientist Professor Maksim Klarin from Zadar Maritime School. Professor Klarin designed the light show's start and end times for 50 years starting in 2008.

Solar modules
The photovoltaic solar modules absorb light energy, transform it into electricity and release it into the power network. The entire system annually produces about 46,500 kWh. It produces half of the energy needed for lighting the Zadar waterfront.

Cost
The construction cost  was 8 million kunas (excluding VAT) (c. 1,3 million euros), while the overall cost (including landscaping) totaled 50 million kunas (c. 7 million euros). Maintenance due to its exposure to sunlight, moisture and salt from 2008-2013 totaled around 700 thousand kunas. An extensive renovation and upgrade project worth 4 million kunas was completed in March 2019.

Vandalism
Damage, such as cracks on solar modules, have been seen on several occasions, mostly on the Sun installation, where 12 solar modules have been damaged, as well as on Jupiter and Saturn. The cracks were caused by a 3500 kg pickup truck that drove over the modules. The City added a 24-hour supervisor and surveillance cameras. In June 2009, an unidentified object smashed four modules, and on the night of August 8, two more. On May 5, 2019, a young man smashed modules with a hammer, causing €90,000 worth of damage.

Gallery

See also

Zadar
Architecture of Croatia
Nine Views, a Solar System model in Zagreb, Croatia

References

Cultural infrastructure completed in 2008
Zadar
Buildings and structures in Zadar
Tourist attractions in Zadar
Buildings and structures in Zadar County
Monuments and memorials in Croatia
Vandalized works of art
Solar System models